Sanjay Gagnani is an Indian television and film actor who predominantly works in Hindi-language television shows.

Career
Gagnani has done many roles in hindi television shows like Bairi Piya (2010), Hamari Devrani (2012), Encounter (2014), Veera (2015), Pyaar Ka The End (2013), Kundali Bhagya (2017), Fear Files: Darr Ki Sacchi Tasvirein (2014), Savdhaan India (2012) and Halla Bol (2014).

Personal life
On 28 November 2021, Gagnani tied the knot with Indian model and actress, Poonam Preet Bhatia in New Delhi.

Filmography

Films

Television

Accolades

References

External links

Sindhi people
Living people
Indian male television actors
Male actors in Hindi television
Indian male film actors
Male actors from Mumbai
1986 births
Actors from Mumbai